Kalmat-e Shalu (also Romanized as Kalmat-e Shālū; also known as Kalmat) is a village in Donbaleh Rud-e Shomali Rural District, Dehdez District, Izeh County, Khuzestan Province, Iran. At the 2006 census, its population was 349, in 67 families.

References 

Populated places in Izeh County